Common rail may refer to:

 Common rail direct fuel injection
 Common rail (electricity)